The Ministry of Labour (Abrv: MOL;), is a Thai government body responsible for the oversight of labour administration and protection, skill development, and the promotion of employment in Thailand. The ministry was founded in 1993 as the "Ministry of Labour and Social Services", then renamed "Ministry of Labour" in 2002.

Organisation and budget
Article 35 of the Act on Reorganization of Ministries, Ministerial Bureaus and Departments, B.E.2545 (2002) established the following MOL structure: 
 Office of the Minister
 Office of the Permanent Secretary
 Department of Employment
 Department of Skill Development
 Department of Labour Protection and Welfare (DLPW)
 Social Security Office

For FY2019, the ministry's budget is 52,594 million baht.

See also
Thai labour law

References

External links
Prohibited Occupations in Thailand

 
Labour in Thailand
Labour
Thailand